An Equity card is proof of membership in the Actors' Equity Association of the United States or Equity in the United Kingdom.

United States

History
Edwin Booth founded the "Players"  in 1888  which held meetings at the "Players." The "Players" was an actors' club in Gramercy Park.  The second organisation, Actors' Society of America, was formed in 1895 and was led by Louis Aldrich. Actors' Society of America was dissolved by vote of members in 1912.

Actors' Equity Association was founded in New York City on May 26, 1913.

Joining Equity
One method for an actor to become eligible to join the union is being under an Equity contract.

An actor may also apply for membership if they are a member of any of the sister unions in the performing arts.  These unions are the American Guild of Musical Artists (AGMA), American Guild of Variety Artists (AGVA), and Screen Actors Guild - American Federation of Television and Radio Artists (SAG-AFTRA).

The third way one gets an equity card is through the "Equity Membership Candidate Program" (EMC).  In this program, actors are allowed to work in Equity productions as credit towards eventual membership.  An actor is eligible for membership once he completes fifty weeks of work at theatres that are a part of the EMC program.

Once a member, the actor is required to pay "yearly dues" of $118 plus "working dues" which are 2.25% of the gross earnings through an equity contract.

Member benefits and privileges
The first major benefit to having an Equity card, as an actor, is that many professional auditions are Equity-only calls.  Non-members are allowed to attend, but with no guarantee of being seen.   Equity members are allowed to attend these Equity-only calls without these restrictions.

Contract benefits for members include minimum wages, work rules such as length of work day, health insurance, pension, and workers' compensation insurance.

Once an individual is a member of Actor's Equity, they may not rehearse or perform in a non-Equity production without written permission from Equity. The rule does not apply to children under the age of 14, who may temporarily withdraw membership in order to perform in a non-equity production such as a school play.

References

External links
Actor's Equity Website

Actors' trade unions
Actors' Equity Association